Eva Boto (born December 1, 1995) is a Slovenian singer. She represented Slovenia at the Eurovision Song Contest 2012 in Baku, Azerbaijan with Verjamem and failed to qualify for the grand final, finishing 17th of 18 entrants. In 2014, she wrote a song called "Na kožo pisana."

Discography 
Albums
 2019: Ko najdeš sebe

singles
 Hej, ti (Deejay Time feat. Eva Boto) (2010)
 Vzemi me (2011)
 To leto bo moje (Max feat. Jan Plestenjak & Eva Boto) (2012)
 Verjamem (2012)
 Run (2012)
 A si sanjal me (2012)
 Dvigni mi krila (2012)
 Silvestrski poljub (with Žanom Serčičem) (2012)
 Plus in minus (2013)
 Na kožo pisana (2014)
 En svet (Slove'n'aid) (2015)
 Ljubezen dela čudeže (with Gašperjem Rifljem) (2015)
 Če boš Štajerca vzela (feat. Črna mačka) (2016)
 Kaj je to življenje (2016)
 Tvoja (2018)
 Zavedno (2019)
 Naj vedo (2019)
 Dovolj je poletja (with Gašperjem Rifljem) (2019)
 Lepo je živet (2020)
 Ko najdeš sebe (2020)
 Ti (2021)
 Kdo ti bo dušo dal (2021)

References 

1995 births
Living people
People from Dravograd
21st-century Slovenian women singers
Eurovision Song Contest entrants of 2012
Eurovision Song Contest entrants for Slovenia